Neotaphos is a genus of beetles in the family Cerambycidae, containing the following species:

 Neotaphos hamaticollis (Guérin-Méneville, 1844)
 Neotaphos rachelis Fisher, 1936

References

Trachyderini
Cerambycidae genera